is a Japanese manga series written and illustrated by Yasuhisa Hara. It has been serialized in Shueisha's seinen manga magazine Weekly Young Jump since January 2006, with its chapters collected in 67 tankōbon volumes as of January 2023. Kingdom provides a fictionalized account of the Warring States period primarily through the experiences of the war orphan Xin and his comrades as he fights to become the greatest general under the heavens, and in doing so, unifying China for the first time in 500 years.

The series was adapted into a four-season anime television series by studio Pierrot. The first 38-episode season aired from June 2012 to February 2013; a second 39-episode season aired from June 2013 to March 2014; a third 26-episode season by Studio Signpost and Pierrot aired from April 2020 to October 2021; a fourth 26-episode season aired from April to October 2022; a fifth season is set to premiere in January 2024. A live-action film was released in April 2019; a sequel film premiered in July 2022; a third film is set to premiere in July 2023. The anime has been licensed for English-language release by Crunchyroll.

As of January 2023, the Kingdom manga had over 95 million copies in circulation, making it one of the best-selling manga series of all time. In 2013, the manga won the Grand Prize of the Tezuka Osamu Cultural Prize.

Synopsis

Historical context
The story of Kingdom is a fictional adaptation of the Chinese history period known as the Warring States period, which ended in 221 BC when Ying Zheng, king of Qin, succeeded in conquering the other states and unifying China.

Several of the characters are based on historical figures. Many characters will take the names of people in history, and other times they will have completely different names; oftentimes, this is the result of Japanese kanji borrowing from Chinese characters, and some Chinese names have no equivalent characters in kanji.

Plot
Born during the Warring States period of ancient China, Xin and Piao are war-orphans working as servants in a poor village in the kingdom of Qin. However, they dream to become the "Great Generals of the Heavens" and train daily. One day, Piao is taken to the palace for an unknown purpose by a minister and Xin is left behind. A few months later, Piao returns to the village on the verge of death, urging Xin to travel to another village. There, Xin meets a boy nearly identical to Piao, Ying Zheng the current King of Qin. Xin learns that Piao served as a body double for Ying Zheng and was mortally wounded in a power struggle for the throne. Though initially furious at Ying Zheng for causing Piao's death, Xin decides to seize the opportunity and aids Ying Zheng in ousting his younger half-brother Cheng Jiao and reclaiming the Qin throne. Successful in this endeavor, Xin starts his military life as a Qin soldier and then commander on the battlefields of the warring states of China. He relentlessly pursues his goal of becoming the "Greatest General in the World", also helping King Zheng of Qin achieve his dream of unification to end the incessant warfare once and for all.

Characters

Xin (Shin in the Japanese version) is an orphan boy who grew up as a servant with his best friend Piao. Xin's behavior is predominantly impulsive, however, he inspires his comrades and those around him. After Piao's death, Xin decides to help the King of Qin, Ying Zheng, escape his enemies with the help of He Liao Diao. Xin enlists in the State of Qin army, and after demonstrating his determination and abilities, General Wang Qi appoints him as the leader of a special 100-man Fei Xin Unit. Appointing Qiang Lei and Yuan as his lieutenants, Xin joins Wang Qi in his attack on the State of Zhao. He develops great respect for Ying Zheng and their paths become interlocked. Following the invasion of the Wei State, he is made leader of a 1,000-man unit.

Ying Zheng is the 31st king of the State of Qin.  He states that he will unify all of China but has only a few years to do so. There are enemies that lay beyond the Qin state (Zhao, Wei, Chu, and other nations) and internal problems with his political rivals, minister Lu Buwei, who plans to take over the throne, and the Queen Dowager. Although king, Ying Zheng has not been crowned, so his power is limited. His and Xin's goals became unified when Xin declares that he would be Ying Zheng's "sword" in the unification of China. He has a child with the servant woman Xiang named Rei.

Xin's childhood best friend and fellow war orphan, Piao also aims to become a general renowned throughout all of China. His appearance is identical to King Ying Zheng and he is offered a position in the Qin palace as Zheng's body double. He accepts the position, only to die fighting at the hands of an assassin hired by the Cheng Jiao Faction. Piao is a fictional character created by the author and does not exist in history.

He Liao Diao is a young girl and the last descendant of a mountain tribe, but she keeps her identity a secret and dresses as a male. She joins Xin in helping Ying Zheng escape from Liu Bu's soldiers. After witnessing Wang Qi and Xin's war against the Zhao, she tells Shin that she will join the State of Qin Army, but he only laughs. He Liao Diao is taken in as an apprentice of strategic warfare, and later in the story, she becomes the strategist for the Fei Xin Unit. It is hinted that she has romantic feelings for Xin, however, he sees their relationship as more like brother and sister.

Qiang Lei is a superb swordswoman and an efficient killer. She is a former member of the Chi You, a female assassin group in which they advance the expense of killing rival candidates. After the death of her older sister, Qiang Xiang, in a rigged series of deathmatches, Qiang Lei vowed revenge against the woman who killed her. She joined the Fei Xin Unit after its formation and became a vice commander, keeping her gender a secret. She is naive in the ways of the world but is much smarter than Xin and he relies on her for battle strategies as well as her sword skills. After Xin discovers her identity, she becomes more friendly and open towards him and she accepts her place in the unit, calling it her home. Her identity is revealed to the rest of the Fei Xin Unit after she is severely wounded in the battle against the Wei State. It is inferred that she may have romantic feelings for Xin.

Lord Changwen was formerly a skilled warrior during the reign of King Zhaoxiang of Qin who worked his way up to be one of Qin's Chancellors along with Lord Changping. He is also a senior adviser of the king. He is extremely loyal to Ying Zheng, aiding him in both reclaiming the throne and in the political struggle against Ying's rival, Lü Buwei.

Lord Changwen's loyal subordinate. Initially, Bi was a 1,000-man commander who rose to the 3000-man commander and finally rises to the rank of General after contributing to many of Qin's military campaigns along with Xin. Xin is shown to rely on him, and he has had a crush on Yang Duan He since their first meeting.

 Based on the real-life Qin general, Wang Yi, Wang Qi was the last remaining "Six Great General's" in the time of King Zhaoxiang of Qin. One of Qin's best generals even at the time of Ying Zheng's coronation, he trained and honed Li Xin's battle and leadership skills and also christened his unit the "Fei Xin Unit". During the Mayang Campaign, Wang Qi faces off against Pang Nuan, one of Zhao's Three Great Generals and the murderer of his fiancé and fellow Six Great's, Liao. Before he can finish Pang Nuan off he is shot from behind with an arrow, allowing Pang Nuan to stab his heart. Despite being mortally wounded he manages to continue fighting before retreated with Xin and his him. Away from the battle, Wang Qi gives Xin his poleax before finally succumbing to his wounds.

 Son of the current Wang family patriarch and Qin great general, Wang Jian. Future heir of the Wang family and relative of the late-Qin great general, Wang Qi. Staunch and strict, does not joke around like Meng Tian or Xin. Very accomplished cavalrymen with top notch spear skills. Fighting for contention of becoming the next "great general" together with Xin and Meng Tian. Commander of his own unit, the "Ye Feng Unit" comprising mostly cavalrymen of nobility origins. 

 Meng Tian was the son of one of the Qin's "Great Six General", Meng Wu, grandson of the old general Meng Ao, brother of Meng Yi and commander of his own unit, the Ye Hua Unit. Often being shown to be rather jovial, someone who does not take things seriously and an extrovert who even befriends even the other unit commanders who were also fighting to be generals like Xin and Wang Ben. Also often seen to be wearing flamboyant outfits that are more fitting for an aristocrat while on the battlefield and his personal unit also follows his style of often being portrayed as a "joker" unit, not being serious of sorts. However, when battle commences, Meng Tian was often proven to be a real swordsman which has impeccable skills and also great leadership skills and excellent tactical planning skills where he can turn the mood of his own forces up quickly from being inactive to a full-on, effective fighting force and also being able to draw up battle plans not only for his own force but often enough for Xin and sometimes even for Wang Ben if their paths met on the battlefield.   

 Lü Buwei initially started out as a prominent and influential trader from Zhao. After helping the prince of Qin, prince Sou Jou (King Zhuangxiang) to escape captivity from Zhou's hands, gained the position of "Minister of the Right" once  Zhuangxiang was promoted to "King". While helping Zhuangxiang to gain power to ascend him to king, started to bribe everyone he can and even offered his own fiance up to Zhuangxiang as his concubine. Over time he would usurp more power in the courts and made himself the chancellor of Qin while struggling for power against Ying Zheng. 

 Yang Duan He is the Mountain King of the mountainous tribes that borders Qin. She initially treated Xin and Ying Zheng with discontent due to how the previous Qin administration had neglected them after their treaty of co-existence lapsed for 400 years. After listening to Zheng's ambitions of unification as well as promising better relationships with the mountain tribes, Yang Duan He decided to trust Sei and the Qin again and followed Sei's advice on leading the mountainous tribes people into a newer world. Revealed to be a woman and she continued consolidating all the other loose tribes into one unified entity under her leadership. Would also pass on the information on Zhao's pacification on the Xiongnu to the north of Zhao's territory which in turn would bear their northern cavalry units down to Bayou Plains to face off with Wang Qi. 

 Li Mu is one of the "Three Greats of Zhao" and one of the major antagonists of the series. Initially shown to be aloof and jovial, he soon reveals himself to be a top notch strategist on the battlefield, even strategizing and claiming the life of Wang Qi at the climactic battle on the Mayang plains between Zhao and Qin.

 Lian Po was one of Zhao's "Three Great Generals". After being stripped of his military command by the new king of Sho, King Daoxiang, Lian Po rebelled and brought his lieutenants and other officers that survived the rebellion into Wei as an exile. However when Qin and Zhao entered an alliance which caused Qin to invade Wei, Lian Po was asked by King Jingmin of Wei to command the entire Wei army against Qin. Lian Po eventually still failed and after the defeat, was again exiled to Chu.

Media

Manga

Shueisha has collected its chapters into individual tankōbon volumes. The first volume was released on May 19, 2006. In 2015, Hara stated that he has planned to extend the series up to 100 volumes. As of January 19, 2023, sixty-seven tankōbon volumes have been released.

Anime

An anime television series was adapted by studio Pierrot. Two seasons of seventy-seven episodes were produced. The first season which consisted of thirty-eight episodes aired from June 4, 2012, to February 25, 2013, on NHK BS Premium. The first season was directed by Jun Kamiya, written by Naruhisa Arakawa, featured music composed by Minako Seki, and was produced by Izumi Nakazawa. The series' characters were designed by Atsuo Tobe, Noriko Otake, and Masatoshi Hakanda.

A second season aired thirty-nine episodes from June 8, 2013 to March 1, 2014. The season featured returning staff Minako Seki and Naruhisa Arakawa, the first season's composer and writer, respectively. Akira Iwanaga replaced Jun Kamiya as director, Izumi Nakazawa served as series producer, and the character designs were handled by Itsuko Takeda, Kumiko Tokunaga, and Makoto Shimojima. The anime has been licensed for English language release by Funimation outside of Asia. Following Sony's acquisition of Crunchyroll, the series was moved to Crunchyroll. Mighty Media has licensed the series in Southeast Asian territories.

On November 8, 2019, a third season of the series was announced, and that the series would feature an entirely new production team, and that the season would cover the manga's Coalition Invasion arc. The series' third season has Kenichi Imaizumi directing at Pierrot and Pierrot's subsidiary company Studio Signpost, with scripts by Noboru Takagi and character designs by Hisashi Abe. Hiroyuki Sawano and Kohta Yamamoto composed the music. The season premiered on April 6, 2020. On April 26, 2020, the anime production committee announced that episode 5 and onwards of the third series would be postponed by the COVID-19 pandemic. The third season restarted broadcasting from its first episode on April 5, 2021, and finished on October 18 of the same year. Unlike with the series' first two seasons, the third season of Kingdom was made using traditional 2D animation, rather than CGI animation. Composers Sawano and Yamamoto were brought onto the project as a personal request from Yasuhisa Hara himself. Director Imaizumi, in meetings with the composers, opted to not use traditional Chinese instruments despite the series' setting, and they instead decided on using modern instrumentations.

At the end of the third season's final episode, a fourth season was announced. It aired from April 10 to October 2, 2022. The cast returned to reprise their roles.

A fifth season was announced at the end of the fourth season, and is set to premiere in January 2024.

Films

On April 17, 2016, a special short movie was posted online by Shueisha. It is a live-action promotional short film for the series, made for the manga's 10th anniversary. It was filmed in Hengdian World Studios in China.

In April 2018, Kingdoms author, Yasuhira Hara, revealed that a full-length live-action film of the series had been green-lit. The author stated he took part in script meetings, praising the 'satisfying' screenplay, the 'unprecedented' budget, and everyone in the 'ultra-grand' casts, starring Kento Yamazaki and directed by Shinsuke Sato. The film was released on April 19, 2019. In total, it generated ¥5.73 billion in box office revenue within Japan and $50.57 million worldwide.

A second film, was announced to be green-lit on May 28, 2020, with Shinsuke Sato returning as director, and the core cast returning to reprise their roles. The film premiered on July 15, 2022. It generated ¥5.16 billion in box office revenue within Japan.

A third sequel was announced, with Shinsuke Sato and much of the cast returning. Titled , it will be released on July 28, 2023.

Video games
A PlayStation Portable beat 'em up styled video game was released on November 25, 2010, entitled Kingdom Ikki Tousen No Tsurugi. The game was released only in Japan.

A free-to-play mobile game called Kingdom: Seven Flags was released on October 24, 2016, in Japan.

A free-to-play mobile game called , was released on February 22, 2018.

Reception

Sales
By April 2017, the Kingdom manga had over 30 million copies in circulation; it had over 38 million copies in circulation by December 2018; over 47 million copies in circulation by November 2019; By December 2020, the manga had over 70 million copies in circulation and its 60th volume was the series' first volume with a first run of 1 million copies. The manga had over 84 million copies in circulation by December 2021; over 87 million copies in circulation by February 2022; over 90 million copies in circulation by June 2022; over 92 million copies in circulation by September 2022; and over 95 million copies in circulation by January 2023.

Kingdom was the 5th best-selling manga of 2015, with over 8.5 million copies sold. It was the 3rd best-selling manga of 2016, with over 6.5 million copies sold. It was the 3rd best-selling manga of 2017, with over 6.1 million copies sold. It was the 6th best-selling manga of 2018, with over 4.9 million copies sold. Kingdom was the 3rd best selling manga in 2019, with over 7.6 million copies sold. Kingdom was the 2nd best-selling manga series in 2020, with over 8.2 million copies sold. It was the 9th best selling manga in 2021, with over 4.6 million copies sold.

Awards and accolades
Kingdom was the grand prize winner for the Tezuka Osamu Cultural Prize in 2013 with one judge commenting, "I can't remember the last time I read nearly 30 volumes (of a manga title) in a row feeling this excited." Kingdom won the first annual Tsutaya Comic Awards' All-Time Best Section in 2017. Kingdom has ranked on the "Book of the Year" list from Media Factory's Da Vinci magazine, where professional book reviewers, bookstore employees, and Da Vinci readers participate; it ranked 46th in 2015; 26th in 2016; 7th in 2018; it topped the list in 2019; it ranked 11th in 2020; 15th in 2021; and 16th in 2022. On TV Asahi's Manga Sōsenkyo 2021 poll, in which 150.000 people voted for their top 100 manga series, Kingdom ranked 13th.

The manga earned a Guinness World Record on December 12, 2012 for Manga written by the most people. The record was due to its "Social Kingdom" campaign in which fans and other artists were given the task of redrawing the entire 26th volume. Participants included manga creators Eiichiro Oda (One Piece), Masashi Kishimoto (Naruto), Hirohiko Araki (JoJo's Bizarre Adventure), Takehiko Inoue (Slam Dunk), Hiroshi Motomiya (Salary Man Kintaro), as well as voice actors and fans. The Social Kingdom campaign was one of the Entertainment Division's Jury Recommended Works at the 16th Japan Media Arts Festival in 2012.

Notes

References

External links
  
  
  
  
  
  
 

2012 anime television series debuts
2013 anime television series debuts
2020 anime television series debuts
Anime composed by Hiroyuki Sawano
Anime productions suspended due to the COVID-19 pandemic
Anime series based on manga
Avex Group
Comics set in Imperial China
Epic anime and manga
Crunchyroll anime
Historical anime and manga
Japanese computer-animated television series
Manga adapted into films
NHK original programming
Pierrot (company)
Seinen manga
Shueisha franchises
Shueisha manga
Studio Signpost
Upcoming anime television series
Winner of Tezuka Osamu Cultural Prize (Grand Prize)
Works set in the 3rd century BC